The Crafts Council is the national development agency for contemporary craft in the United Kingdom, and is funded by Arts Council England.

History
The Crafts Advisory Committee was formed in 1971 to advise the Minister for the Arts, David Eccles, 1st Viscount Eccles, ‘on the needs of the artist craftsman and to promote a nation-wide interest and improvement in their products’. 
Its first meeting was held on 6 October 1971 at the Council of Industrial Design (later the Design Council). It was later chaired by Sir Paul Sinker. 

In 1973, the Committee purchased Waterloo Place, London. It began publishing the journal Crafts.  It also held its first exhibition, The Craftsman's Art (1973) at the Victoria and Albert Museum, accompanied by publication of the exhibition catalog of the same name. In 1974, it launched the Crafts Advisory Committee Index, an information service for and about craftspeople.

In April 1979 the Crafts Advisory Committee was renamed the Crafts Council.
In 1982, the organisation was granted a Royal Charter and became independent of the Design Council.

In 1991, the Crafts Council moved to 44a Pentonville Road, London, where premises included a reference library, a shop, a café, an education workshop and a gallery space. In 1999 it became a funded organisation of the Arts Council of Great Britain (later the Arts Council of England).

In 2006, the Crafts Council decreased its on-site activity and closed the gallery, shop, education workshop and café in order for the Crafts Council to increase its regional activity via partnership working.

In 2011, its 40th anniversary year, over 400,000 visitors saw its five temporary exhibitions, 27,000 people attended its craft fairs, and over 7,000 children and young people participated in its nationwide initiatives.

Funding 
The Crafts Council is supported by Arts Council England.

The Crafts Council is also supported by a number of trusts and foundations and private patrons who support touring exhibitions, professional development schemes and participation and learning programmes. All meet the aims and objectives of charitable organisations supporting the arts.

People
The Crafts Council is made up of a number of specialist teams, reflecting the various aspects of its work, and is overseen by a Senior Management Team, and ultimately a board of Trustees.

Archives

References

External links
Crafts Council website

Crafts organizations
Cultural organisations based in the United Kingdom
Arts in the United Kingdom
1971 establishments in the United Kingdom